Artur Lyavitski (born 17 March 1985) is a Belarusian former professional footballer.

Honours
Gomel
Belarusian Cup winner: 2010–11
Belarusian Super Cup winner: 2012

Minsk
Belarusian Cup winner: 2012–13

External links

1985 births
Living people
Footballers from Minsk
Belarusian footballers
Association football midfielders
FC RUOR Minsk players
FC Dinamo-Juni Minsk players
FC Veras Nesvizh players
FC Savit Mogilev players
FC Torpedo-BelAZ Zhodino players
FC Gomel players
FC Minsk players
FC Torpedo Mogilev players
FC Gorki players